Edmund P. Radigan (January 7, 1889 – April 1968) was an American businessman and politician from New York.

Life
He was born on January 7, 1889, in New York City. In 1915, he married Anna Margaret Rosenberger, and their only child was Edmund P. Radigan, Jr. (1918–2007). He lived in Stapleton, Staten Island, and retailed office machines. He entered politics as a Republican.

He was a member of the New York State Assembly from 1945 to 1948, sitting in the 165th and 166th New York State Legislatures. In 1946, the New York City authorities planned to establish a garbage dump on Staten Island. As an answer, Radigan introduced in the Assembly in 1947 a bill for the secession of the borough of Staten Island from the City of New York. The bill was defeated, and the garbage dump project was abandoned.

He died in April 1968.

References

Republican Party members of the New York State Assembly
1889 births
1968 deaths
20th-century American politicians
Politicians from Staten Island